David William Crews (February 18, 1933 – February 8, 2015) was an American lawyer and politician.

Born in Karnes City, Texas, Crews received his bachelor's degree from Baylor University and his law degree from Baylor Law School. He practiced law in Conroe, Texas. From 1961 to 1969, Crews served in the Texas House of Representatives as a Democrat. Crews died in Conroe, Texas.

Notes

1933 births
2015 deaths
People from Conroe, Texas
People from Karnes City, Texas
Baylor University alumni
Baylor Law School alumni
Texas lawyers
Democratic Party members of the Texas House of Representatives
20th-century American lawyers